The Guadalupe Group (K2G, Ksg) is a geological group of the Altiplano Cundiboyacense, Eastern Ranges of the Colombian Andes.

Etymology 
The group was published in 1978 by Pérez and Salazar and named after its type locality Guadalupe Hill in the Eastern Hills of Bogotá.

Description

Lithologies 
The Guadalupe Group is characterised by three formations; two sandstone sequences, Arenisca Dura and Arenisca Labor-Tierna, and an intermediate shale formation; Plaeners.

Stratigraphy and depositional environment 
The Guadalupe Group overlies the Conejo Formation in the central part of the Altiplano Cundiboyacense and the Chipaque Formation in the eastern part and is overlain by the Guaduas Formation. Some authors define the Guadalupe Group as a formation and call the individual formations members. The age has been estimated to be Campanian-Maastrichtian. The Guadalupe Group has been deposited in a marine environment.

Outcrops 

The formations of the Guadalupe Group are apart from its type locality at Guadalupe Hill, Bogotá, found in other parts of the Eastern Hills of Bogotá, the Ocetá Páramo and many other locations, such as the Piedras del Tunjo in the Eastern Ranges.

At present, the Guadalupe Group in the anticlinals of Zipaquirá and Nemocón contains rock salt. These halite deposits are not originally deposited in the Late Cretaceous Guadalupe Group, yet are allochthonous diapirs formed when the Jurassic-Lower Cretaceous normal faults were reactivated as reverse faults during the mayor Miocene tectonic movements of the Eastern Ranges. The salt had been deposited during the Early Cretaceous (Valanginian-Barremian, approximately 135 to 125 Ma), intruding into the overlying formations of the Upper Cretaceous.

Regional correlations

Panorama

See also 

 Geology of the Eastern Hills
 Geology of the Ocetá Páramo
 Geology of the Altiplano Cundiboyacense

Notes

References

Bibliography

Maps

External links 

 

Geologic groups of South America
Geologic formations of Colombia
Cretaceous Colombia
Upper Cretaceous Series of South America
Campanian Stage
Maastrichtian Stage of South America
Sandstone formations
Shale formations
Shallow marine deposits
Reservoir rock formations
Groups
Geography of Cundinamarca Department
Geography of Bogotá